"Sex Talk" is a song by American rapper Megan Thee Stallion. It was released on March 22, 2019, as the lead single off of Megan Thee Stallion's first commercial mixtape, Fever. The song lyrically discusses the sexual intentions of the rapper.

After The Release
The day after the song was released, news writer Britany Spanos wrote about the song in Rolling Stone, stating that the song was "a seductive late-night banger that’s propelled by a bass-blowing, body-shaking bass."

Personnel
DJwillAye - Producer
Megan Thee Stallion - lead vocals/writer

References

Rolling Stone
Megan Thee Stallion